Caldeiro is a surname. Notable people with the surname include:

Fernando Caldeiro (1958–2009), Argentine scientist and NASA astronaut
Alex Caldiero (born 1949), American poet and scholar